TR Warszawa  (also Teatr Rozmaitości w Warszawie, i.e., Variety Theatre in Warsaw) is a theatre in Warsaw, Poland, by Marszałkowska Str., 8.

History
Its history began in 1945, when a stage of the Municipal Dramatic Theatres (Miejskie Teatry Dramatyczne) was opened in the basement by Marszałkowska 8. The theatre has existed as an independent entity since 1972. The theatre has operated under various names:  Teatr Rozmaitości (1948–1949), later Teatr Dzieci Warszawy (Theatre of the Children of Warsaw) then Teatr Mlodej Warszawy (Theatre of Young Warsaw) and again as Teatr Rozmaitości.

References

Theatres in Warsaw
1945 establishments in Poland
Theatres completed in 1945